The Suckers is a 1972 American sexploitation film directed by Stu Segall under the pseudonym Arthur Byrd, and written by Ted Paramore (credited as Edward Everett). It is an adaptation of the 1924 short story "The Most Dangerous Game", written by Richard Connell, with a plot that follows a big-game hunter who invites employees from a modeling agency to his estate, where he hunts them. The film stars Richard Smedley, Lori Rose, Vincent Stevens, Sandy Dempsey, Barbara Mills, and Norman Fields.

The Suckers was filmed in the Bronson Canyon area of California over the course of three days, and was released in the United States in 1972. The only surviving print of the film, from a 1976 re-release, appears to contain at least two instances of missing footage. This print was used for a DVD release of the film by Vinegar Syndrome in 2013.

Cast
 Richard Smedley as Jeff Baxter
 Lori Rose as Joanne
 Steve Vincent as Steve Vandemeer (credited as Vincent Stevens)
 Sandy Dempsey as Barbara
 Barbara Mills	as Cindy Stone
 Norman Fields as George Stone

Production

The Suckers was filmed in 35 mm over the course of three days, in the Bronson Canyon area of the Hollywood Hills in California. The film's budget is estimated to have been around $30,000, and the crew was reportedly made up of "less than ten" people. According to director Stu Segall, the film was "very cheaply made", with the crew making around $50 a day and the cast members making around $150.

During filming one day, actor Norman Fields swallowed a bee before he was able to finish his scenes. He was taken to a hospital and returned to the set several hours later.

Home media
In April 2013, The Suckers was released on DVD by Vinegar Syndrome as a double feature with the 1971 film The Love Garden. This release made use of the lone surviving print of The Suckers, from a 1976 re-release of the film by Lee Ming Film Company. This print appears to feature at least two instances of missing footage, which take place during Vandemeer's hunt for other characters.

Critical reception
Bryan Senn, in his book The Most Dangerous Cinema: People Hunting People on Film, wrote that certain directorial decisions, "and/or intuitive happy accidents", that he observed in The Suckers causes him to "wish that Segall had slipped his sexploitation bonds and received more opportunities to make 'straight' films". He concluded: "while not always 'fun' watching, The Suckers offers just enough, both sexploitation- and Most Dangerous Game-wise, to keep viewers from feeling one."

References

Bibliography

External links
 

1970s exploitation films
American sexploitation films
Films based on short fiction
Films about hunters
Films based on thriller novels
1970s English-language films
1970s American films
1970s rediscovered films
Rediscovered American films